The North Station is the major railway station in Valencia, Spain. It is located in the city centre next to the Plaza de Toros de Valencia, the city's bullring, and 200m from the town hall.

The building is one of the main works of the Valencian Art Nouveau and was declared Good of Cultural Heritage in 1987. It has connections with Metrovalencia and the city bus network.

AVE (high-speed) trains from Madrid and some other long-distance trains use Valencia-Joaquín Sorolla railway station, a short walk away, instead.

This station's name is a reference to Caminos de Hierro del Norte de España (Railways of the North of Spain), the railway company that constructed it and opened it in 1917, which was later nationalized and incorporated into RENFE, and later separated into Adif, the company that currently owns and runs it. It was declared a Bien de Interés Cultural (Good of Cultural Heritage, a type of listed monument) in 1987.

Dutch Symphonic Metal band Within Temptation performed at the station in July 2005 as a one-time event. The concert was filmed and broadcast on Spanish television.

Services

References 

Railway stations in the Valencian Community
Railway stations opened in 1852
Art Nouveau architecture in the Valencian Community
Buildings and structures in Valencia
1852 establishments in Spain
Art Nouveau railway stations
Rail transport in Valencia
Railway stations in Spain opened in 1852